Carl Schmitt (11 July 1888 – 7 April 1985) was a German jurist, political theorist, and prominent member of the Nazi Party. Schmitt wrote extensively about the effective wielding of political power. A conservative theorist, he is noted as a critic of parliamentary democracy, liberalism, and cosmopolitanism. His work has been a major influence on subsequent political theory, legal theory, continental philosophy, and political theology, but its value and significance are controversial, mainly due to his intellectual support for and active involvement with Nazism. Schmitt's work has attracted the attention of numerous philosophers and political theorists, including Giorgio Agamben, Hannah Arendt, Walter Benjamin, Susan Buck-Morss, Jacques Derrida,  Waldemar Gurian, Carlo Galli, Jaime Guzmán, Jürgen Habermas,  Friedrich Hayek, Reinhart Koselleck, Chantal Mouffe, Antonio Negri, Leo Strauss, Adrian Vermeule, and Slavoj Žižek, among others.

According to the Stanford Encyclopedia of Philosophy, "Schmitt was an acute observer and analyst of the weaknesses of liberal constitutionalism and liberal cosmopolitanism. But there can be little doubt that his preferred cure turned out to be infinitely worse than the disease."

Life 
Schmitt was born in Plettenberg, Westphalia, German Empire. His parents were Roman Catholics from the German Eifel region who had settled in Plettenberg. His father was a minor businessman. Schmitt studied law at Berlin, Munich and Strasbourg and took his graduation and state examinations in then-German Strasbourg during 1915. His 1910 doctoral thesis was titled Über Schuld und Schuldarten (On Guilt and Types of Guilt).

Schmitt volunteered for the army in 1916. The same year, he earned his habilitation at Strasbourg with a thesis under the title Der Wert des Staates und die Bedeutung des Einzelnen (The Value of the State and the Significance of the Individual). He then taught at various business schools and universities, namely the University of Greifswald (1921), the University of Bonn (1921), the Technische Universität München (1928), the University of Cologne (1933), and the University of Berlin (1933–45).

In 1916, Schmitt married his first wife, Pavla Dorotić, a Croatian woman who pretended to be a countess. They divorced, but no annulment was granted by a Catholic Church tribunal, so that his 1926 marriage to Duška Todorović (1903–1950), a Serbian, was not deemed valid under Catholic law. Schmitt was excommunicated by the Church due to his second marriage.
 
Schmitt and Todorović have a daughter, Anima, who in 1957 married Alfonso Otero Varela (1925–2001), a Spanish law professor at the University of Santiago de Compostela and a member of the ruling Spanish Falange party in Francoist Spain. She translated several of her father's works into Spanish. Letters from Schmitt to his son-in-law have been published.

Schmitt died on 7 April 1985 and is buried in Plettenberg.

Religious beliefs 
As a young man, Schmitt was "a devoted Catholic until his break with the church in the mid twenties." From around the end of the First World War, he began to describe his Catholicism as "displaced" and "de-totalised". Consequently, Gross argues that Schmitt's work "cannot be reduced to Roman Catholic theology given a political turn. Rather, Schmitt should be understood as carrying an atheistic political-theological tradition to an extreme."

Schmitt met Mircea Eliade, a Romanian religion historian, in Berlin in the summer of 1942 and later spoke to his friend Ernst Jünger of Eliade and his interest in Eliade's works.

Hitler's seizure of control
Schmitt remarked on 31 January 1933 that with Adolf Hitler's appointment as Chancellor, "one can say that 'Hegel died. Richard Wolin observes:

it is Hegel qua philosopher of the "bureaucratic class" or Beamtenstaat that has been definitely surpassed with Hitler's triumph... this class of civil servants—which Hegel in the Rechtsphilosophie deems the "universal class"—represents an impermissible drag on the sovereignty of executive authority. For Schmitt... the very essence of the bureaucratic conduct of business is reverence for the norm, a standpoint that could not but exist in great tension with the doctrines of Carl Schmitt... Hegel had set an ignominious precedent by according this putative universal class a position of preeminence in his political thought, insofar as the primacy of the bureaucracy tends to diminish or supplant the prerogative of sovereign authority.

The Nazis forced through the passage of the Enabling Act of 1933 in March, which changed the Weimar Constitution to allow the "present government" to rule by decree, bypassing both the President, Paul von Hindenburg, and the Reichstag.

Alfred Hugenberg, the leader of the German National People's Party, one of the Nazis' partners in the coalition government that was being squeezed out of existence, hoped to slow the Nazi takeover of the country by threatening to quit his ministry position in the Cabinet. Hugenberg reasoned that by doing so, the government would thereby be changed, and the Enabling Act would no longer apply, as the "present government" would no longer exist. A legal opinion by Schmitt prevented this maneuver from succeeding. At the time well known as a constitutional theorist, Schmitt declared that "present government" did not refer to the Cabinet's makeup when the act was passed, but to the "completely different kind of government"—that is, different from the democracy of the Weimar Republic—that Hitler's cabinet had brought into existence.

[[File:Grabstein Carl Schmitts.jpeg|right|thumb|Tombstone of Carl Schmitt, Catholic cemetery, Plettenberg-Eiringhausen (the inscription is a reference to the Odyssey, in which Odysseus's having 'seen many cities and learnt their customs' is changed to 'and learnt their laws''')]]

Career

Academic career (1921–1932)

During 1921, Schmitt became a professor at the University of Greifswald, where he published his essay Die Diktatur (on dictatorship).
In 1922 he published Politische Theologie (political theology) while working as a professor at the University of Bonn. Schmitt changed universities in 1926, when he became professor of law at the Handelshochschule in Berlin, and again in 1932, when he accepted a position in Cologne. His most famous paper, "Der Begriff des Politischen" ("The Concept of the Political"), was based on lectures at the Deutsche Hochschule für Politik in Berlin.

In 1932, Schmitt was counsel for the Reich government in the case Preussen contra Reich (Prussia v. Reich), in which the Social Democratic Party of Germany-controlled government of the state of Prussia disputed its dismissal by the right-wing Reich government of Franz von Papen. Papen was motivated to do so because Prussia, by far the largest state in Germany, served as a powerful base for the political left and provided it with institutional power, particularly in the form of the Prussian police. Schmitt, Carl Bilfinger and Erwin Jacobi represented the Reich and one of the counsel for the Prussian government was Hermann Heller. The court ruled in October 1932 that the Prussian government had been suspended unlawfully but that the Reich had the right to install a commissar. In German history, the struggle resulting in the de facto destruction of federalism in the Weimar republic is known as the Preußenschlag.

Nazi Party

Schmitt joined the Nazi Party on 1 May 1933. Within days, he supported the party in the burning of books by Jewish authors, rejoiced in the burning of "un-German" and "anti-German" material, and called for a much more extensive purge, to include works by authors influenced by Jewish ideas. From June 1933, he was in the leadership council of Hans Frank's Academy for German Law and served as chairman of the Committee for State and Administrative Law. In July, Hermann Göring appointed him to the Prussian State Council, and in November he became the president of the Association of National Socialist German Jurists. He also replaced Heller as a professor at the University of Berlin, a position he held until the end of World War II. He presented his theories as an ideological foundation of the Nazi dictatorship and a justification of the Führer state concerning legal philosophy, particularly through the concept of auctoritas.

In July he published in it "The Leader Protects the Law (Der Führer schützt das Recht)", a justification of the political murders of the Night of the Long Knives with Hitler's authority as the "highest form of administrative justice (höchste Form administrativer Justiz)". Schmitt presented himself as a radical antisemite and was the chairman of an October 1936 law teachers' convention in Berlin at which he demanded that German law be cleansed of the "Jewish spirit (jüdischem Geist)" and that all Jewish scientists' publications be marked with a small symbol.

Nevertheless, in December 1936, the Schutzstaffel (SS) publication Das Schwarze Korps accused Schmitt of being an opportunist, a Hegelian state thinker, and a Catholic, and called his antisemitism a mere pretense, citing earlier statements in which he criticized the Nazis' racial theories. After this, Schmitt resigned as Reichsfachgruppenleiter (Reich Professional Group Leader) but retained his professorship in Berlin and his title "Prussian State Councillor". Schmitt continued to be investigated into 1937, but Göring stopped further reprisals.Noack, Paul, Carl Schmitt – Eine Biographie, 1996, Frankfurt

During the German occupation of Paris a "round-table" of French and German intellectuals met at the Georges V Hotel, including Schmitt, the writers Ernst Jünger, Paul Morand, Jean Cocteau, and Henry Millon de Montherlant, and the publisher Gaston Gallimard.

After World War II

In 1945, American forces captured Schmitt and, after spending more than a year in an internment camp, he returned to his home town of Plettenberg and later to the house of his housekeeper Anni Stand in Plettenberg-Pasel. He remained unrepentant for his role in the creation of the Nazi state, and refused every attempt at denazification, which barred him from academic jobs. Despite being isolated from the mainstream of the scholarly and political community, he continued his studies, especially of international law, from the 1950s on, and frequently received visitors, both colleagues and younger intellectuals, well into his old age. Important among these visitors were Ernst Jünger, Jacob Taubes and Alexandre Kojève.

In 1962, Schmitt gave lectures in Francoist Spain, two of which resulted in the publication, the next year, of Theory of the Partisan, in which he characterized the Spanish Civil War as a "war of national liberation" against "international Communism". Schmitt regarded the partisan as a specific and significant phenomenon which, during the latter half of the 20th century, indicated the emergence of a new theory of warfare.

Publications
On Dictatorship
In his essay Die Diktatur (on dictatorship) he discussed the foundations of the newly established Weimar Republic, emphasising the office of the Reichspräsident. In this essay, Schmitt compared and contrasted what he saw as the effective and ineffective elements of the new constitution of his country. He saw the office of the president as a comparatively effective element, because of the power granted to the president to declare a state of exception (Ausnahmezustand). This power, which Schmitt discussed and implicitly praised as dictatorial, was more in line with the underlying mentality of executive power than the comparatively slow and ineffective processes of legislative power reached through parliamentary discussion and compromise.

Schmitt was at pains to remove what he saw as a taboo surrounding the concept of "dictatorship" and to show that the concept is implicit whenever power is wielded by means other than the slow processes of parliamentary politics and the bureaucracy:

For Schmitt, every government capable of decisive action must include a dictatorial element within its constitution. Although the German concept of Ausnahmezustand is best translated as "state of emergency", it literally means "state of exception" which, according to Schmitt, frees the executive from any legal restraints to its power that would normally apply. The use of the term "exceptional" has to be underlined here: Schmitt defines sovereignty as the power to decide to initiate a state of exception, as Giorgio Agamben has noted. According to Agamben, Schmitt's conceptualization of the "state of exception" as belonging to the core-concept of sovereignty was a response to Walter Benjamin's concept of a "pure" or "revolutionary" violence, which did not enter into any relationship whatsoever with right. Through the state of exception, Schmitt included all types of violence under right, in the case of the authority of Hitler leading to the formulation "The leader defends the law" ("Der Führer schützt das Recht").

Schmitt opposed what he termed "commissarial dictatorship", or the declaration of a state of emergency in order to save the legal order (a temporary suspension of law, defined itself by moral or legal right): the state of emergency is limited (even if a posteriori, by law) to "sovereign dictatorship", in which law was suspended, as in the classical state of exception, not to "save the Constitution", but rather to create another constitution. This is how he theorized Hitler's continual suspension of the legal constitutional order during the Third Reich (the Weimar Republic's Constitution was never abrogated, emphasized Giorgio Agamben; rather, it was "suspended" for four years, first with the 28 February 1933 Reichstag Fire Decree, with the suspension renewed every four years, implying a continual state of emergency).

Political Theology On Dictatorship was followed by another essay in 1922, titled Politische Theologie (political theology); in it, Schmitt, gave further substance to his authoritarian theories with the now notorious definition: "Sovereign is he who decides on the exception." By "exception", Schmitt means stepping outside the rule of law under the state of exception (Ausnahmezustand) doctrine he first introduced in On Dictatorship for the purpose of managing some crisis, which Schmitt defines loosely as "a case of extreme peril, a danger to the existence of the state, or the like." For this reason, the "exception" is understood as a "borderline concept" for Schmitt because it is not within the purview of the normal legal order. Schmitt opposes this definition of sovereignty to those offered by contemporary theorists on the issue, particularly Hans Kelsen, whose work is criticized at several points in the essay. The state of exception is a critique of "normativism", a positivist concept of law developed by Kelsen of law as the expression of norms that are abstract and generally applicable, in all circumstances.

A year later, Schmitt supported the emergence of totalitarian power structures in his paper "Die geistesgeschichtliche Lage des heutigen Parlamentarismus" (roughly: "The Intellectual-Historical Situation of Today's Parliamentarianism", translated as The Crisis of Parliamentary Democracy by Ellen Kennedy). Schmitt criticized the institutional practices of liberal politics, arguing that they are justified by a faith in rational discussion and openness that is at odds with actual parliamentary party politics, in which outcomes are hammered out in smoke-filled rooms by party leaders. Schmitt also posits an essential division between the liberal doctrine of separation of powers and what he holds to be the nature of democracy itself, the identity of the rulers and the ruled. Although many critics of Schmitt today, such as Stephen Holmes in his The Anatomy of Anti-Liberalism, take exception to his fundamentally authoritarian outlook, the idea of incompatibility between liberalism and democracy is one reason for the continued interest in his political philosophy.

In chapter 4 of his State of Exception (2005), Italian philosopher Giorgio Agamben argued that Schmitt's Political Theology ought to be read as a response to Walter Benjamin's influential essay Towards the Critique of Violence.

The book's title derives from Schmitt's assertion (in chapter 3) that "all significant concepts of the modern theory of the state are secularized theological concepts"—in other words, that political theory addresses the state (and sovereignty) in much the same manner as theology does God.

The Concept of the Political

For Schmitt, "the political" is not equal to any other domain, such as the economic (which distinguishes between profitable and not profitable), but instead is the most essential to identity. While churches are predominant in religion or society is predominant in economics, the state is usually predominant in politics. Yet, for Schmitt, the political was not autonomous or equivalent to the other domains, but rather the existential basis that would determine any other domain should it reach the point of politics (e.g. religion ceases to be merely theological when it makes a clear distinction between the "friend" and the "enemy").

Schmitt, in perhaps his best-known formulation, bases his conceptual realm of state sovereignty and autonomy upon the distinction between friend and enemy. Schmitt writes: The political enemy need not be morally evil or aesthetically ugly...But he is, nevertheless, the other, the stranger…" This distinction is to be determined "existentially", which is to say that the enemy is whoever is "in a specially intense way, existentially something different and alien, so that in the extreme case conflicts with him are possible". Such an enemy need not even be based on nationality: so long as the conflict is potentially intense enough to become a violent one between political entities, the actual substance of enmity may be anything. In this work, Schmitt makes the distinction between several different types of enemies one may make, stating that political enemies ought to be made out of a legitimate concern for the safety of the state rather than moral intuitions.

The collectivization of friendship and enmity is, for Schmitt, the essence of politics. This theory of politics was influential in the Third Reich where the recognition and eradication of the enemy became a necessary component of the collective national identity. Similar views were shared by other Nazi legal theorists like Werner Best. Although there have been divergent interpretations concerning this work, there is broad agreement that The Concept of the Political is an attempt to achieve state unity by defining the content of politics as opposition to the "enemy". Additionally, the prominence of the state stands as an arbitrary force dominating potentially fractious civil society, whose various antagonisms must not be allowed to affect politics, lest civil war result.

Dialogue with Leo Strauss
Schmitt provided a positive reference for Leo Strauss, and approved his work, which was instrumental in winning Strauss the scholarship funding that allowed him to leave Germany. In turn, Strauss's critique and clarifications of The Concept of the Political led Schmitt to make significant emendations in its second edition. Writing to Schmitt during 1932, Strauss summarized Schmitt's political theology thus: "[B]ecause man is by nature evil, he therefore needs dominion. But dominion can be established, that is, men can be unified only in a unity against—against other men. Every association of men is necessarily a separation from other men ... the political thus understood is not the constitutive principle of the state, of order, but a condition of the state." Some of the letters between Schmitt and Strauss have been published.

 The Leviathan in the State Theory of Thomas Hobbes The Leviathan in the State Theory of Thomas Hobbes, with the subtitle "Meaning and Failure of a Political Symbol", is a 1938 work by Schmitt that revisits one of his most critical theoretical inspirations: Thomas Hobbes. Schmitt's work can be described as both a critique and appraisal of the controversial political theorist. This work also contains some of Schmitt's more anti-Semitic language. As contemporary writers on Schmitt have noted, his anti-Semitism may be read as more a kind of "anti-Judaism" as, unlike his Nazi allies, he did not attribute the dangers of Judaism to "biological" reasons but strictly religious ones. This work by Schmitt is also one of the most intimately involved by him with the concept of myth in a political setting.

The text itself begins with an overview of the religious history of the mythical character "Leviathan". Schmitt traces this character as a unique subject of conflicting interpretations in Abrahamic doctrines, whereby the Leviathan, understood most pointedly as a "big fish," is occasionally interchangeable with that of a dragon or serpent, which Schmitt remarks have been "protective and benevolent deities" in the history of non-Jewish peoples. But, as Schmitt makes clear, Hobbes' Leviathan is very different from these interpretations, being illustrated firstly in his work Leviathan as a "huge man". The Leviathan as a "huge man" is used throughout Hobbes' work as a symbol of the sovereign person. Although the Leviathan is not the only allegory made by Hobbes of the sovereign, which gravitates throughout his work as "a huge man, a huge leviathan, an artificial being, an animal artificiale, an automaton, or a machina". Hobbes' concern was mainly to convey the sovereign person as a frightening creature that could instill fear into those chaotic elements of man that belong to his interpretation of the state of nature.

Schmitt's critique of Hobbes begins with Hobbes' understanding of the state as a "machine" which is set into motion by the sovereign. This, says Schmitt, is really just a continuation of Descartes' dualism of man between mind and body. For Hobbes to conceptualize the state as a machine whose soul is the sovereign renders it really as just a mechanic structure, carrying over the cartesian dualism into political theory: "As a totality, the state is body and soul, a homo artificialis, and, as such, a machine. It is a manmade product... the soul thereby becomes a mere component of a machine artificially manufactured by man." Schmitt adds that this technical conception of the state is essential in the modern interpretation of government as a widespread administrative organ. Therefore, Schmitt attributes Hobbes' mechanistic and often also a legally positivist interpretation of the state (what is legitimate = what is legal) with the process of political neutralization. This is consistent with Schmitt's larger attitude toward attempts to apply technical principles to political matters.

Also, Schmitt critiques Hobbes' insistence that belief in miracles must only be outwardly consistent with the position of the state and can, privately, deviate into one's own opinion as to the validity of such "miracles". The belief in miracles was a relevant point in Hobbes' century for kings would regularly "bestow miracles" by touching the hands of those of ill health, supposedly healing them—obviously a consequence of the medieval belief that kings had a divine character. Hobbes' position was that "private reason" may disagree with what the state claims to be a miracle, but the "public reason" must by necessity agree to its position in order to avoid chaos. Schmitt's critique of Hobbes here is twofold. Firstly, Hobbes opens the crack toward a liberal understanding of individual rights (such as the right to "private reason") which Schmitt was a tireless critique of and, secondly, Hobbes guts the state of any "substantive truth" (such as the genuine belief of the individual, even in private, of the kings divine right) and renders the state into now simply a "justifiable external power". This opens up the elementary basis of liberal society which, for Schmitt, was pluralism. Such a pluralist society lacked ideological homogeneity and nationally bound group identity, both of which were fundamental premises of a democratic society to Schmitt. Despite his critiques, Schmitt, nonetheless, finishes the book with a celebration of Hobbes as a truly magnificent thinker, ranking him along with other theorists he values greatly like Niccolò Machiavelli and Giambattista Vico.

Nomos of the EarthThe Nomos of the Earth is Schmitt's most historical and geopolitical work. Published in 1950, it was also one of his final texts. It describes the origin of the Eurocentric global order, which Schmitt dates from the discovery of the New World, discusses its specific character and its contribution to civilization, analyses the reasons for its decline at the end of the 19th century, and concludes with prospects for a new world order. It defends European achievements, not only in creating the first truly global order of international law, but also in limiting war to conflicts among sovereign states, which, in effect, civilized war. In Schmitt's view, the European sovereign state was the greatest achievement of Occidental rationalism; in becoming the principal agency of secularization, the European state created the modern age.

Notable in Schmitt's discussion of the European epoch of world history is the role played by the New World, which ultimately replaced the Old World as the centre of the Earth and became the arbiter in European and world politics. According to Schmitt, the United States' internal conflicts between economic presence and political absence, between isolationism and interventionism, are global problems, which today continue to hamper the creation of a new world order. But however critical Schmitt is of American actions at the end of the 19th century and after World War I, he considered the United States to be the only political entity capable of resolving the crisis of global order.

Hamlet or Hecuba
Published in 1956, Hamlet or Hecuba: The Intrusion of the Time into the Play was Schmitt's most extended piece of literary criticism. In it Schmitt focuses his attention on Shakespeare's Hamlet and argues that the significance of the work hinges on its ability to integrate history in the form of the taboo of the queen and the deformation of the figure of the avenger. Schmitt uses this interpretation to develop a theory of myth and politics that serves as a cultural foundation for his concept of political representation. Beyond literary criticism or historical analysis, Schmitt's book also reveals a comprehensive theory of the relationship between aesthetics and politics that responds to alternative ideas developed by Walter Benjamin and Theodor W. Adorno.

Theory of the Partisan
Schmitt's Theory of the Partisan originated in two lectures delivered during 1962, and has been seen as a rethinking of The Concept of the Political. It addressed the transformation of war in the post-European age, analysing a specific and significant phenomenon that ushered in a new theory of war and enmity. It contains an implicit theory of the terrorist, which during the 21st century has resulted in yet another new theory of war and enmity. In the lectures, Schmitt directly tackles the issues surrounding "the problem of the Partisan" figure: the guerrilla or revolutionary who "fights irregularly" (p. 3). Both because of its scope, with extended discussions on historical figures like Napoleon Bonaparte, Vladimir Lenin, and Mao Zedong, as well as the events marking the beginning of the 20th century, Schmitt's text has had a resurgence of popularity. Jacques Derrida, in his Politics of Friendship remarked:

Despite certain signs of ironic distrust in the areas of metaphysics and ontology, The Concept of the Political was, as we have seen, a philosophical type of essay to 'frame' the topic of a concept unable to constitute itself on philosophical ground. But in Theory of the Partisan, it is in the same areas that the topic of this concept is both radicalized and properly uprooted, where Schmitt wished to regrasp in history the event or node of events that engaged this uprooting radicalisation, and it is precisely there that the philosophical as such intervenes again.

Schmitt concludes Theory of the Partisan with the statement: "The theory of the partisan flows into the question of the concept of the political, into the question of the real enemy and of a new nomos of the earth." Schmitt's work on the Partisan has since spurred comparisons with the post-9/11 'terrorist' in recent scholarship.

Influence
Through Walter Benjamin, Giorgio Agamben, Andrew Arato, Chantal Mouffe and other writers, Schmitt has become a common reference in recent writings of the intellectual left as well as the right. These discussions concern not only the interpretation of Schmitt's own positions, but also matters relevant to contemporary politics: the idea that laws of the state cannot strictly limit actions of its sovereign, the problem of a "state of exception" (later expanded upon by Agamben).

Schmitt's argument that political concepts are secularized theological concepts has also recently been seen as consequential for those interested in contemporary political theology. The German-Jewish philosopher Jacob Taubes, for example, engaged Schmitt widely in his study of Saint Paul, The Political Theology of Paul (Stanford Univ. Press, 2004). Taubes' understanding of political theology is, however, very different from Schmitt's, and emphasizes the political aspect of theological claims, rather than the religious derivation of political claims.

Schmitt is described as a "classic of political thought" by Herfried Münkler, while in the same article Münkler speaks of his post-war writings as reflecting an: "embittered, jealous, occasionally malicious man" ("verbitterten, eifersüchtigen, gelegentlich bösartigen Mann"). Schmitt was termed the "Crown Jurist of the Third Reich" ("Kronjurist des Dritten Reiches") by Waldemar Gurian.

Timothy D. Snyder has asserted that Schmitt's work has greatly influenced Eurasianist philosophy in Russia by revealing a counter to the liberal order.

According to historian Renato Cristi in the writing of the 1980 Constitution of Chile, Pinochet collaborator Jaime Guzmán based his work on the pouvoir constituant concept used by Schmitt (as well as drawing inspiration in the ideas of market society of Friedrich Hayek). This way Guzmán would have enabled a framework for a dictatorial state combined with a free market economic system.

Law of emergency powers

Schmitt's "state of exception" doctrine has enjoyed a revival in the 21st century. Formulated 10 years before the 1933 Nazi takeover of Germany, Schmitt claimed that urgency justified the following:

Special executive powers
Suspension of the Rule of Law
Derogation of legal and constitutional rights

Schmitt's doctrine helped clear the way for Hitler's rise to power by providing the theoretical legal foundation of the Nazi regime.

China
Some have argued that Schmitt has become an important influence on Chinese political theory in the 21st century, particularly since Xi Jinping became General Secretary of the Chinese Communist Party in 2012. Leading Chinese Schmittians include the theologian Liu Xiaofeng, the public policy scholar Wang Shaoguang, and the legal theorist and government adviser Jiang Shigong. Schmitt’s ideas have proved popular and useful instruments in justifying the legitimacy of Communist Party rule.

The first important wave of Schmitt's reception in China started with Liu's writings at the end of the 1990s. In the context of a transition period, Schmitt was used both by liberal, nationalist and conservative intellectuals to find answers to contemporary issues. In the 21st century, most of them are still concerned with state power and to what extent a strong state is required to tackle China's modernization. Some authors consider Schmitt's works as a weapon against liberalism. Others think that his theories are helpful for China's development.

A critical reception of his use in a Chinese context does also exist. These differences go together with different interpretations of Schmitt's relation with fascism. While some scholars regard him as a faithful follower of fascism, others, such as Liu Xiaofeng, consider his support to the Nazi regime only as instrumental and attempt to separate his works from their historical context. According to them, his real goal is to pave a different and unique way for the modernization of Germany—precisely what makes him interesting for China. Generally speaking, the Chinese reception is ambivalent: quite diverse and dynamic, but also highly ideological. Other scholars are cautious when it comes to Schmitt's arguments for state power, considering the danger of totalitarianism, they assume at the same time that state power is necessary for the current transition and that a "dogmatic faith" in liberalism is unsuitable for China. By emphasizing the danger of social chaos, many of them agree with Schmitt—beyond their differences—on the necessity of a strong state.

 Russia 
Several scholars have noted the influence of Carl Schmitt on Vladimir Putin and Russia, specifically in defense of illiberal norms and exercising power, such as in disputes with Ukraine."A Schmittian reading of Russian thinking" by Andrew Wilson, UCL European Institute, 28 February 2022

Works

English translations of Carl Schmitt
Note: a complete bibliography of all English translations of Schmitt's books, articles, essays, and correspondence is available here.
 The Concept of the Political. George D. Schwab, trans. (University of Chicago Press, 1996; expanded edition 2007, with an introduction by Tracy B. Strong). Original publication: 1st edn., Duncker & Humblot (Munich), 1932; 2nd edn., Duncker & Humblot (Berlin), 1963. (The 1932 text is an elaboration of a 1927 journal article of the same title.)
 Constitutional Theory. Jeffrey Seitzer, trans. (Duke University Press, 2007). Original publication: 1928.
 The Crisis of Parliamentary Democracy. Ellen Kennedy, trans. (MIT Press, 1988). Original publication: 1923, 2nd edn. 1926.
 Dictatorship. Michael Hoelzl and Graham Ward, trans. (Polity Press, 2014). Original publication: 1921, 2nd edn. 1928.
 Four Articles, 1931–1938. Simona Draghici, trans. (Plutarch Press, 1999). Originally published as part of Positionen und Begriffe im Kampf mit Weimar – Genf – Versailles, 1923–1939 (1940).Hamlet Or Hecuba: The Intrusion of the Time Into the Play. David Pan and Jennifer R. Rust, trans. (Telos Press, 2009). Originally published 1956.
 The Idea of Representation: A Discussion. E. M. Codd, trans. (Plutarch Press, 1988), reprint of The Necessity of Politics (1931). Original publication: 1923.
 Land and Sea. Simona Draghici, trans. (Plutarch Press, 1997). Original publication: 1942.
 Legality and Legitimacy. Jeffrey Seitzer, trans. (Duke University Press, 2004). Original publication: 1932.
 The Leviathan in the State Theory of Thomas Hobbes: Meaning and Failure of a Political Symbol. George D. Schwab & Erna Hilfstein, trans. (Greenwood Press, 1996). Original publication: 1938.
 The Nomos of the Earth in the International Law of the Jus Publicum Europaeum. G.L. Ulmen, trans. (Telos Press, 2003). Original publication: 1950.
 On the Three Types of Juristic Thought. Joseph Bendersky, trans. (Praegar, 2004). Original publication: 1934.
 Political Romanticism. Guy Oakes, trans. (MIT Press, 1986). Original publication: 1919, 2nd edn. 1925.
 Political Theology: Four Chapters on the Concept of Sovereignty. George D. Schwab, trans. (MIT Press, 1985 / University of Chicago Press; University of Chicago edition, 2004 with an Introduction by Tracy B. Strong. Original publication: 1922, 2nd edn. 1934.
 Roman Catholicism and Political Form. G. L. Ulmen, trans. (Greenwood Press, 1996). Original publication: 1923.
 State, Movement, People (includes The Question of Legality). Simona Draghici, trans. (Plutarch Press, 2001). Original publication: Staat, Bewegung, Volk (1933); Das Problem der Legalität (1950).
 Theory of the Partisan. G. L. Ulmen, trans. (Telos Press, 2007). Original publication: 1963; 2nd ed. 1975.
 The Tyranny of Values. Simona Draghici, trans. (Plutarch Press, 1996). Original publication: 1979.
 War/Non-War: A Dilemma. Simona Draghici, trans. (Plutarch Press, 2004). Original publication: 1937.

Works in German
 Über Schuld und Schuldarten. Eine terminologische Untersuchung, 1910.
 Gesetz und Urteil. Eine Untersuchung zum Problem der Rechtspraxis, 1912.
 Schattenrisse (published under the pseudonym "Johannes Negelinus, mox Doctor", in collaboration with Dr. Fritz Eisler), 1913.
 Der Wert des Staates und die Bedeutung des Einzelnen, 1914.
 Theodor Däublers 'Nordlicht': Drei Studien über die Elemente, den Geist und die Aktualität des Werkes, 1916.
 Die Buribunken, in: Summa 1/1917/18, 89 ff.
 Politische Romantik, 1919.
 Die Diktatur. Von den Anfängen des modernen Souveränitätsgedankens bis zum proletarischen Klassenkampf, 1921.
 Politische Theologie. Vier Kapitel zur Lehre von der Souveränität, 1922.
 Die geistesgeschichtliche Lage des heutigen Parlamentarismus, 1923.
 Römischer Katholizismus und politische Form, 1923.
 Die Rheinlande als Objekt internationaler Politik, 1925.
 Die Kernfrage des Völkerbundes, 1926.
 Der Begriff des Politischen, in: Archiv für Sozialwissenschaft und Sozialpolitik vol. 58, no. 1, 1927, 1–33.
 Volksentscheid und Volksbegehren. Ein Beitrag zur Auslegung der Weimarer Verfassung und zur Lehre von der unmittelbaren Demokratie, 1927.
 Verfassungslehre, 1928.
 Hugo Preuß. Sein Staatsbegriff und seine Stellung in der dt. Rechtslehre, 1930.
 Der Völkerbund und das politische Problem der Friedenssicherung, 1930, 2., erw. Aufl. 1934.
 Der Hüter der Verfassung, 1931.
 Der Begriff des Politischen, 1932 (elaboration of the 1927 essay).
 Legalität und Legitimität, 1932.
 Starker Staat und gesunde Wirtschaft, 1933
 Staat, Bewegung, Volk. Die Dreigliederung der politischen Einheit, 1933.
 Das Reichsstatthaltergesetz, 1933.
 Der Führer schützt das Recht, 1934.
 Staatsgefüge und Zusammenbruch des Zweiten Reiches. Der Sieg des Bürgers über den Soldaten, 1934.
 Über die drei Arten des rechtswissenschaftlichen Denkens, 1934.
 Der Staat als Mechanismus bei Hobbes und Descartes, 1936.
 Der Leviathan in der Staatslehre des Thomas Hobbes, 1938.
 Die Wendung zum diskriminierenden Kriegsbegriff, 1938.
 Völkerrechtliche Großraumordnung mit Interventionsverbot für raumfremde Mächte. Ein Beitrag zum Reichsbegriff im Völkerrecht, 1939.
 Positionen und Begriffe im Kampf mit Weimar – Genf – Versailles 1923–1939, 1940 (collection of essays).
 Land und Meer. Eine weltgeschichtliche Betrachtung, 1942.
 Der Nomos der Erde im Völkerrecht des Jus Publicum Europaeum, 1950.
 Donoso Cortes in gesamteuropäischer Interpretation, 1950.
 Ex captivitate salus. Erinnerungen der Zeit 1945/47, 1950.
 Die Lage der europäischen Rechtswissenschaft, 1950.
 Das Gespräch über die Macht und den Zugang zum Machthaber, 1954.
 Hamlet oder Hekuba. Der Einbruch der Zeit in das Spiel, 1956.
 Verfassungsrechtliche Aufsätze aus den Jahren 1924–1954, 1958 (collection of essays).
 Theorie des Partisanen. Zwischenbemerkung zum Begriff des Politischen, 1963.
 Politische Theologie II. Die Legende von der Erledigung jeder Politischen Theologie, 1970.
 Glossarium. Aufzeichnungen der Jahre 1947–1951, edited by Eberhard Freiherr von Medem, 1991 (posthum).
 Das internationale Verbrechen des Angriffskrieges, edietd by Helmut Quaritsch, 1993 (posthum).
 Staat – Großraum – Nomos, edited by Günter Maschke, 1995 (posthum).
 Frieden oder Pazifismus? Edited by Günter Maschke, 2005 (posthum).
 Carl Schmitt: Tagebücher, edited by Ernst Hüsmert, 2003 ff. (posthum).

See also
 Streitbare Demokratie German nationalism

References
Notes

Citations

Bibliography
 
 
  Reviewed here.
 
 
 
 
 

Further reading

 Giacomo Maria Arrigo, Islamist Terrorism in Carl Schmitt's Reading, In Circolo 4 (2017).
 Jeffrey Andrew Barash, Politiques de l'histoire. L'historicisme comme promesse et comme mythe (2004)
 Eckard Bolsinger, The Autonomy of the Political: Carl Schmitt's and Lenin's Political Realism (2001)
 
 Caldwell, Peter C. "Controversies over Carl Schmitt: a review of recent literature". The Journal of Modern History (2005), vol. 77, no. 2, pp. 357–387.
 Renato Cristi, Carl Schmitt and Authoritarian Liberalism (1998)
 Mariano Croce, Andrea Salvatore, The Legal Theory of Carl Schmitt (Abingdon: Routledge, 2012) .
 Jacques Derrida, "Force of Law: The 'Mystical Foundation of Authority'", in Acts of Religion (2002).
 , "Hamlet: Representation and the Concrete" (translated from Italian by Adam Sitze and Amanda Minervini) in Points of Departure: Political Theology on the Scenes of Early Modernity, ed. Julia Reinhard Lupton and Graham Hammill, University of Chicago Press, 2011
 Gross, Raphael. Carl Schmitt and the Jews. The "Jewish Question," the Holocaust, and German Legal Theory. Translated by Joel Golb. Foreword by Peter C. Caldwell. Madison, University of Wisconsin Press, 2007. 
 Paul Gottfried, Carl Schmitt: Politics and Theory (New York: Greenwood Press, 1990) 
 Michael Hardt & Antonio Negri, Empire (2000).
 Julia Hell, "Katechon: Carl Schmitt's Imperial Theology and the Ruins of the Future", The Germanic Review 84:4 (2009): 283–326.
 Herrero, Montserrat. 2015. The political discourse of Carl Schmitt. Lanham, Maryland: Rowman & Littlefield.
 William Hooker, Carl Schmitt's International Thought: Order and Orientation (Cambridge: Cambridge University Press, 2009) 
 
 Lena Lindgren, Review of Carl Schmitt The Concept of the Political (Review of the Swedish edition Det politiska som begrepp, Sociologisk Forskning 2011:3, pp. 114–116; translated into English)
 Michael Marder, "Groundless Existence: The Political Ontology of Carl Schmitt" (London & New York: Continuum, 2010).
 Reinhard Mehring: Carl Schmitt – Aufstieg und Fall. Eine Biographie. München: Verlag C.H. Beck, 2009. .
 Heinrich Meier: The Lesson of Carl Schmitt: Four Chapters on the Distinction between Political Theology and Political Philosophy. University of Chicago Press, 2011. .
 Jens Meierhenrich and Oliver Simons, eds. The Oxford Handbook of Carl Schmitt. Oxford University Press, 2017. 
 Ojakangas Mika, A Philosophy of Concrete Life: Carl Schmitt and the political thought of late modernity (2nd ed Peter Lang, 2006), 
 
 
 Müller, Ingo (1991). Hitler's Justice: The Courts of the Third Reich. Translated by Deborah Lucas Schneider.  Cambridge (Mass.): Harvard University Press. 
 
 Gabriella Slomp, Carl Schmitt and the Politics of Hostility, Violence and Terror (New York: Palgrave Macmillan, 2009) 
 Nicolaus Sombart, Die deutschen Männer und ihre Feinde: Carl Schmitt, ein deutsches Schicksal zwischen Männerbund und Matriarchatsmythos, Munich: Hanser, 1991.  (2nd ed Fischer TB, Frankfurt, 1997).
 Telos 72, "Carl Schmitt: Enemy or Foe?" New York: Telos Press, Summer 1987.
 Telos 109, "Carl Schmitt Now". New York: Telos Press, Fall 1996.
 Telos 125, "Carl Schmitt and Donoso Cortés". New York: Telos Press, Fall 2002.
 Telos 132, "Special edition on Carl Schmitt". New York: Telos Press, Fall 2005.
 Telos 142, "Culture and Politics in Carl Schmitt". New York: Telos Press, Spring 2008.
 Telos 147, "Carl Schmitt and the Event". New York: Telos Press, Summer 2009.
 Telos 153, "Special issue on Carl Schmitt's Hamlet or Hecuba". New York: Telos Press, Winter 2010.
 Ola Tunander, The Dual State and the Sovereign: A Schmittian Approach to Western Politics, Challenge Second Annual Report to the European Commission 2006 (7.3.3 Work package 3 – Deliverable No. 32), Challenge, Brussels
 Johannes, Türk. "The Intrusion: Carl Schmitt's Non-Mimetic Logic of Art". Telos 142 (2008): 73–89.
 Francesco Tigani. "Fra immaginazione e realtà: dalla critica del Romanticismo alla teologia politica negli scritti di Thomas Ernest Hulme e Carl Schmitt", Información Filosófica, XIII (2016), pp. 91–110.
 Francesco Tigani. Le ceneri del politico in due capitoli: il teologo e l'erostrato (Milano: Meltemi, 2019). 
 Arthur Versluis, "Carl Schmitt, the Inquisition, and Totalitarianism", in: Arthur Versluis, The New Inquisitions: Heretic-Hunting and the Intellectual Origins of Modern Totalitarianism, Oxford University Press, 2006.
 Ignaz Zangerle, "Zur Situation der Kirche", Der Brenner 14 (1933/34): 52 ff.
 

External links

 The Return of Carl Schmitt by Scott Horton Balkinization 7 November 2005 –discusses the continuing influence of Schmitt's legal theories in modern American politics
 Focus on the International Theory of Carl Schmitt in the Leiden Journal of International Law (LJIL). Contributions by Louiza Odysseos and Fabio Petito, Robert Howse, Jörg Friedrichs, Christoph Burchard and Thalin Zarmanian.
 The Germanic Review, a journal of German critical studies, has published numerous special issues and articles about Carl Schmitt.
 Telos, a journal of politics and critical theory, has published numerous articles both by and about Carl Schmitt, including special sections on Schmitt in issues 72 (Summer 1987), 109 (Fall 1996), 125 (Fall 2002), 132 (Fall 2005), 142 (Spring 2008), 147 (Summer 2009), and 153 (Winter 2010). Telos Press Publishing has also published English translations of Schmitt's The Nomos of the Earth (2003), Theory of the Partisan (2007), and Hamlet or Hecuba (2009).
 "World Orders: Confronting Carl Schmitt's The Nomos of the Earth". A special issue of SAQ: South Atlantic Quarterly, volume 104, number 2. William Rasch, special issue editor.
 "The Nazi Jurist" in Claremont Review of Books, Summer 2015.
 "A Fascist Philosopher Helps Us Understand Contemporary Politics" by Alan Wolfe. Chronicle of Higher Education'', April 2, 2004. Archived from the original on May 3, 2006.
 "Carl Schmitt and Nuremberg" by Joseph W. Bendersky, Telos Press, July 19, 2007.
 Schmitt, Carl (1888–1985)
 

1888 births
1985 deaths
20th-century German philosophers
20th-century German theologians
Anti-Masonry
Antisemitism in Germany
Conservative Revolutionary movement
Far-right politics in Germany
Geopoliticians
German anti-communists
German fascists
German male writers
German Army personnel of World War I
German nationalists
German political philosophers
German political scientists
Hobbes scholars
Academic staff of the Humboldt University of Berlin
Jurists from North Rhine-Westphalia
Members of the Academy for German Law
Nazi Party members
People excommunicated by the Catholic Church
People from Plettenberg
People from the Province of Westphalia
Philosophers of law
Political theologians
Academic staff of the Technical University of Munich
Academic staff of the University of Bonn
Academic staff of the University of Cologne
Academic staff of the University of Greifswald
20th-century political scientists